Guybon Damant Atherstone M. Inst. C.E. AKC (1843 - 1912), South African railway engineer.

Education 
Atherstone was the son of William Guybon Atherstone (medical practitioner, naturalist, geologist and MP) and was born in Grahamstown on 20 June 1843, he attended St. Andrew's College, Grahamstown and King's College London where he qualified as a civil engineer.

Railway engineering 

Atherstone was employed at the Cape Government Railways as an engineer from 1873 to 1896 during which he built the railway line between Alicedale and Grahamstown. The house in which he lived during the construction is adjacent to a stone arch railway bridge which he built. On completion of the railway project Atherstone's house was converted into an Anglican church, St. Cyprians Anglican Church, which was dedicated on 29 November 1893.

See also

Notes and references 

 
 
 
 
 

1843 births
1912 deaths
Alumni of St. Andrew's College, Grahamstown
Alumni of King's College London
Associates of King's College London
19th-century South African engineers
South African civil engineers
Railway civil engineers
People from Makhanda, Eastern Cape